Inna is a Romanian pop singer.

Inna may also refer to:

 Inna (given name)
 Inna (album), an album by Romanian singer Inna
 Inna (Rennebu), in Rennebu municipality in Trøndelag county, Norway
 Inna (Verdal), a river in Verdal municipality in Trøndelag county, Norway
 848 Inna, a minor planet in the solar system
 INNA, meaning "Irish need not apply", a variation of NINA (No Irish need apply)

See also 
 Sisters of inna
 IINA, media player software for macOS